Two Tone Club is a French ska band from Montbéliard. They are mainly influenced by 2 Tone ska, but also reggae and rocksteady. Their track "Club 69" pays homage to the roots of the skinhead movement.

Discography
 2002 Number 1 
 2005 Turn Off (Big8Records/Grover)
 2007 Now Is The Time
 2018 Don't Look Back

External links 
  Official website 

French ska groups
Musical groups from Bourgogne-Franche-Comté